Alexei Nikolaevich Koledaev (born March 27, 1976) is Kazakhstani former professional ice hockey defenceman.

Koledaev played the majority of his career with Metallurg Novokuznetsk. He also played for Torpedo Ust-Kamenogorsk and HC Sibir Novosibirsk. He was also a member of the Kazakhstan national team, playing in three Ice Hockey World Championships (2005, 2006 and 2010) as well as the 2006 Winter Olympics.

Career statistics

Regular season and playoffs

International

References

External links

1976 births
Living people
Ice hockey players at the 2006 Winter Olympics
Kazakhstani ice hockey defencemen
Kazakhstani people of Russian descent
Kazzinc-Torpedo players
Metallurg Novokuznetsk players
Olympic ice hockey players of Kazakhstan
PSK Sakhalin players
HC Sibir Novosibirsk players
Sokol Krasnoyarsk players
Sportspeople from Oskemen
Asian Games gold medalists for Kazakhstan
Medalists at the 2011 Asian Winter Games
Asian Games medalists in ice hockey
Ice hockey players at the 2011 Asian Winter Games